María Luisa Paredes Bartolomé (born 3 April 1946), known professionally as Marisa Paredes, is a Spanish actress.

Biography
Paredes began acting in 1960 film, 091 Policia al Habla (091, Police Speaking!) She became a teen idol across Spain after that film. In 1961, she made her début in theatre and since then she has performed different plays such as Hamlet with Eduard Fernández. In 1975, she and Raphael collaborated in a cartoon film about him, Rafael en Raphael. She has participated in 73 films and television series. She portrayed the leading role of La Peregrina in a television production of Alejandro Casona's La dama del alba.

Pedro Almodóvar helped her to achieve her international fame, as she starred many of his films. In fact, in Spain, she is called "una chica Almodóvar" ("an Almodóvar girl"). She appeared in  High Heels (1991), The Flower of My Secret (1995), All About My Mother (1999) and The Skin I Live In (2011). For her role in The Flower of My Secret, she was nominated for the Best Actress Goya Award.

She has appeared in several other acclaimed films, including In a Glass Cage (1986) by Agustí Villaronga (Majorca), Life Is Beautiful (1998) by Roberto Benigni (Italy), Deep Crimson (1996) by Arturo Ripstein and The Devil's Backbone (2001) by Guillermo del Toro (both from Mexico).

In 1996, she was given the National Film Award by the Spanish Ministry of Culture. From 2000 to 2003 she was the president of the Academia de las Artes y las Ciencias Cinematográficas de España. This period has been one of the most controversial ones as in the beginnings of the Iraq War, the workers of the cinema industry complained about this and other polemical issues.

In 2007, she was given at Gijón International Film Festival, a National Film Award named after Nacho Martinez. Her last cinematic success was the film Latin Lover (Spanish: Mi familia Italiana) (2015).

In the 1970s, she had a domestic partnership of about 7 years with filmmaker Antonio Isasi-Isasmendi, whom with she had one daughter, María Isasi. Since 1983, she has been in a relationship with Chema Prado.

Filmography

Awards 

Goya Awards

Screen Actors Guild Awards 

Fotogramas de Plata

Union of Actors Awards

References

External links

1946 births
Living people
Actresses from Madrid
Spanish film actresses
20th-century Spanish actresses
21st-century Spanish actresses
Chicas Almodóvar